Prolonging the Magic is the third studio album by American alternative rock band Cake. It was released on October 6, 1998, on Capricorn Records. The sole successful single was "Never There". The album was recorded after the departure of guitarist Greg Brown and features a rotating lineup of musicians to replace him. One of them, Xan McCurdy, became his full-time replacement.
On its opening week, Prolonging the Magic sold about 44,000 copies, debuting at No. 33 on the Billboard 200 chart. On 28 September 1999 the album was certified platinum by the RIAA for shipments of one million copies.

The album was given a parental advisory sticker not because of profanity but for Satanic-themed lyrics. Some copies do not feature a sticker, with the only difference being that the song "Satan Is My Motor" has been retitled "Motor".

The song "Hem of Your Garment" was featured in the film Me, Myself & Irene.

Critical reception

Allmusic wrote, "Supposedly their attempt to make a smugness- and irony-free album, Cake's third release does hold back the barbs a bit more than usual. And the strain shows. In these guys' hands, love songs without smirks and pop tunes straight up come out forced."

Track listing

Personnel
Cake
 John McCrea – vocals, guitar, piano, organ, Moog, producing, arranging and design 
 Vince DiFiore - trumpet, background vocals and arranging
 Gabe Nelson - bass, mandolin, guitar, piano and arranging
 Todd Roper - drums, percussion, background vocals and arranging
Additional musicians
 Xan McCurdy – electric guitar on track 9
 Rusty Miller – electric guitar on track 3
 Tyler Pope – arranging and electric guitar on tracks 1, 2, 3, 4, 5, 8, 9 and 10
 Chuck Prophet - arranging and electric guitar on tracks 4, 7 and 12 
 Jim Campilongo - arranging and electric guitar on tracks 4, 6 and 11
 Ben Morss - arranging and piano on track 5
 David Palmer - keyboards on track 9
 Greg Vincent - pedal steel guitar on tracks 2, 6 and 9
 Mark Needham - additional percussion, engineering, and mixing
 Richard Lyman - musical saw on track 4

 Additional personnel
 Joe Johnston - engineering
 Jay Bowman - engineering 
 Gabriel Shepard - engineering 
 Justin Phelps - engineering 
 Scott Reams - engineering 
 Rafael Serrano - engineering 
 Kirt Shearer - engineering and mixing
 Craig Long - engineering and mixing 
 Greg Brown - arranging
 Keara Fallon - design
 Don C. Tyler - mastering

Charts
Album - Billboard (United States)

Singles - Billboard (United States)

Certifications

References

External links
 

1998 albums
Cake (band) albums
Capricorn Records albums